Cry Like a Rainstorm, Howl Like the Wind is a studio album by American singer/producer Linda Ronstadt, released in October 1989 by Elektra Records. Produced by Peter Asher, the album features several duets with singer Aaron Neville — two of which earned Grammy Awards — and several songs written by Jimmy Webb and Karla Bonoff. The album was a major success internationally. It sold over three million copies and was certified Triple Platinum in the United States alone.

Composition
Cry Like a Rainstorm, Howl Like the Wind is a diverse collection of songs in the rock, R&B, and pop genres. In addition, the album contains a few ballads, most notably Jimmy Webb's "Adios". Of the twelve tracks, Ronstadt included four duets with Aaron Neville, of Neville Brothers fame. In addition, the album is noted for its big production values including backing musicians the Skywalker Symphony, Tower of Power horns, and the Oakland Interfaith Gospel Choir. There are also tracks by songwriters Jimmy Webb, Karla Bonoff, and an appearance of Brian Wilson, as back up singer and musical arranger on Ronstadt's fourteenth Top 10 Adult Contemporary single "Adios". The album's arrangers include Marty Paich, David Campbell, Jimmy Webb, Greg Adams, and Terrance Kelly.

Reception
Cry Like a Rainstorm, Howl Like the Wind received critical acclaim and put Ronstadt back at top of the charts with the #1 Gold-certified hit single "Don't Know Much", one of the duets with Neville. "Don't Know Much" and "All My Life", another chart-topping duet with Neville, won Grammy Awards in 1990 and 1991 respectively for Best Pop Vocal Performance by a Duo or Group. The album earned Ronstadt a Grammy nomination for Best Pop Vocal Performance, Female alongside Bette Midler, Bonnie Raitt, Gloria Estefan, and Paula Abdul. The album reached #7 on the US Billboard 200, spending well over a year on the chart, and selling over three million copies in the United States alone (certified triple platinum).

Cry Like a Rainstorm, Howl Like the Wind stands as one of Ronstadt's three biggest selling studio albums of all-time in the United States (along with Simple Dreams and What's New). It is also one of her biggest selling albums worldwide, especially in Australia and the United Kingdom, selling over 100,000 copies (certified gold). This album is currently out of print but is still available online for download and streaming.

When the album reached the Billboard Top 10 in late 1989, Ronstadt became only the second female recording artist in history to achieve ten Top 10 albums, following Barbra Streisand.

Track listing

Personnel

Musicians

 Linda Ronstadt – lead and harmony vocals, backing vocals (4)
 Aaron Neville – lead and harmony vocals (3, 4, 5, 11)
 Jimmy Webb – acoustic piano (1), orchestral arrangements (6)
 Robbie Buchanan – keyboards (1, 3, 4, 7, 10, 11, 12), organ (2, 4)
 Don Grolnick – acoustic piano (2, 3, 5, 7-12), keyboards (6)
 William D. "Smitty" Smith – electric piano (4)
 Michael Landau – electric guitar (1-9, 11, 12)
 Dean Parks – electric guitar (1, 2, 4, 6-11)
 Andrew Gold – electric guitar (3), 12-string electric guitar (7), guitar (12)
 Leland Sklar – bass (1, 4, 5, 9, 12)
 David Hungate – bass (2, 3, 6, 8, 10, 11)
 Carlos Vega – drums (1-6, 8-11)
 Russ Kunkel – drums (7, 12)
 Michael Fisher – percussion (1, 5, 7, 9)
 Peter Asher – percussion (7)
 Tower of Power – horns (11)
 Marty Paich – orchestral arrangements and conductor (1, 2, 8, 10)
 Terrance Kelly – choir arrangements and conductor (2, 8, 9)
 David Campbell – orchestral arrangements (3, 5, 7, 12), conductor (3-7, 11, 12)
 Greg Adams – orchestral arrangements (4, 11), horn arrangements (11), conductor (11)
 The Skywalker Symphony Orchestra – orchestra (1-8, 10, 11, 12)
 Pavel Farkas – concertmaster (1-8, 10, 11, 12)
 Rosemary Butler – additional backing vocals (2), backing vocals (4, 7)
 Oakland Interfaith Gospel Choir – choir (2, 8, 9)
 Jon Joyce – backing vocals (4)
 Arnold McCuller – backing vocals (4)
 Brian Wilson – backing vocals (6), arrangements (6)

Production
 Peter Asher – producer
 Steve Tyrell – co-producer (Track 5)
 George Massenburg – recording and mixing
 Frank Wolf – additional recording
 Bob Edwards – assistant engineer
 Sharon Rice – assistant engineer
 Mike Ross – assistant engineer
 Jim Schelter – assistant engineer
 Ivy Skoff – production coordination
 Doug Sax - Mastering
 John Kosh – art direction, design
 Robert Blakeman – photography
 Cathy Kerr – personal assistant 
 Janet Stark – personal assistant
 Charles Barber – assistant to Marty Paich
 Jeff Beal – orchestra musical coordinator
 Greg Sudmeier – orchestra musical coordinator

Charts

Weekly charts

Year-end charts

Certifications

References

1989 albums
Linda Ronstadt albums
Albums produced by Peter Asher
Albums arranged by David Campbell (composer)
Albums arranged by Jimmy Webb
Albums arranged by Marty Paich
Elektra Records albums
Aaron Neville albums
Grammy Award for Best Engineered Album, Non-Classical